= Ivelisse Jiménez =

Ivelisse Jiménez (born 1966) is a Puerto Rican painter, installation artist, and draftswoman. She is a recipient of the Joan Mitchell Award.
